L'Impératrice ("The Empress") is a French pop and nu-disco band formed in 2012 in Paris.

Career
L'Impératrice is a group of six musicians: Charles de Boisseguin, the group's founder (keyboards), Hagni Gwon (keyboards), David Gaugué (bass guitar), Achille Trocellier (electric guitar), Tom Daveau (drums), and Flore Benguigui (vocals), who joined the band in 2015.

They released their first, self-titled EP in 2012, followed by a second (Sonate Pacifique) in 2014, and then a third (Odyssée) in 2015. The latter was re-edited a year later under the name L'Empereur, in a slower version of the original, inspired by a fan's mistake of playing the album at the wrong speed. An acoustic version using violin, cello and acoustic guitar was also released, in February 2017.

The band received the Deezer Adami Fans' award in 2016.

In 2016, a single, "Vanille Fraise," was released, based on a sample by the soul singer Anita Ward.

The band then joined the independent label microqlima, releasing an EP title, Séquences, in June 2017. Remixes of its songs, one by the Australian group Parcels, were released that September.

On 17 October 2017, the band released "Erreur 404", the first single off their first full-length album, Matahari.  L'impératrice appeared on the French television show Quotidien on TMC on 9 January 2018.

The band performed at La Cigale on 12 October 2017, and then at the Casino de Paris on 3–4 April 2018. It completed a French tour between February and May 2018. An extension of this tour took place between October 2018 and January 2019.

On 21 June 2018, during the Fête de la Musique, the band performed at the French National Assembly.

References

External links 
 Official website
 
 
 

Musical groups from Paris
French pop music groups
French disco groups
Nu-disco musicians
Musical groups established in 2012
2012 establishments in France